Phisare is a village in the Karmala taluka of Solapur district in Maharashtra state, India.

Demographics
Covering  and comprising 281 households at the time of the 2011 census of India, Phisare had a population of 1374. There were 742 males and 632 females, with 149 people being aged six or younger.

References

Villages in Karmala taluka